Abdulaziz al-Omari (also transliterated as Alomari or al-Umari; May 28, 1979 – September 11, 2001) was a Saudi terrorist who was one of five hijackers of American Airlines Flight 11 as part of the September 11 attacks in 2001. Prior to the terrorist attack, al-Omari was an airport security guard and imam.

Al-Omari arrived in the United States in June 2001, on a tourist visa, obtained through the Visa Express program. On September 11, 2001, al-Omari boarded American Airlines Flight 11 and assisted in the hijacking of the plane, which was crashed into the North Tower of the World Trade Center, as part of the coordinated attacks.

Early life and education

Little is known about al-Omari's life, and it is unclear whether some information refers to Omari or another person by that name. He had used the birth date May 28, 1979.

It is alleged al-Omari graduated with honors from high school, attained a degree from Imam Muhammad ibn Saud Islamic University, was married and had a daughter briefly before the attacks.

Career
Al-Omari is alleged to have often served as an imam at his mosque in Saudi Arabia and is believed by American authorities to have been a student of Saudi cleric Sulaiman Al-Alwan, whose mosque is located in Al-Qassim Province.

According to Walid bin Attash, al-Omari was one of a group of future hijackers who provided security at Kandahar airport after their basic training at an al-Qaeda camp. During the 2000 Al Qaeda Summit in Kuala Lumpur, American authorities state that immigration records show that a person named Abdulaziz al-Omari was visiting the country, although they say they are not sure that this was the same person.

In the autumn of 2001, after the September 11 attacks, al Jazeera television broadcast a tape they claim was made by al-Omari. The speaker made a farewell suicide video. In it he read, "I am writing this with my full conscience and I am writing this in expectation of the end, which is near. . . God praise everybody who trained and helped me, namely the leader Sheikh Osama bin Laden."

According to FBI director Robert Mueller and the 9/11 Commission, al-Omari entered the United States through a Dubai flight on June 29, 2001, with Salem al-Hazmi, landing in New York. He had used the controversial Visa Express program to gain entry. He apparently stayed with several other hijackers in Paterson, New Jersey, before moving to his own place at 4032 57th Terrace, Vero Beach, Florida. On his rental agreement form for that house, al-Omari gave two license-plates authorized to park in his space, one of which was registered to Atta.

Al-Omari obtained a fake United States ID card from All Services Plus in Passaic County, New Jersey, which was in the business of selling fake documents, including another to Khalid al-Mihdhar.  He was married and had a daughter.

September 11 attacks

On September 10, 2001, Mohamed Atta picked up al-Omari from the Milner Hotel in Boston, Massachusetts, and the two drove their rented Nissan car to a Comfort Inn in South Portland, Maine, where they spent the night in room 232. It was initially reported that Adnan and Ameer Bukhari were the two hijackers who had rented and driven the car.

In the early hours of September 11, they boarded a commuter flight back to Boston to connect to American Airlines Flight 11. American 11 was hijacked 15 minutes after the flight departed by al-Omari and four other hijackers, which allowed trained pilot Mohamed Atta to crash the Boeing 767 into the North Tower of the World Trade Center as part of an attack that killed thousands of people.

Mistaken identity allegations
Controversy over the identity of al-Omari erupted shortly after the attacks. At first, the FBI had named Abdul Rahman al-Omari, a pilot for Saudi Arabian Airlines, as the pilot of Flight 11. It was quickly shown that this person was still alive, and the FBI issued an apology. It was also quickly determined that Mohamed Atta was the pilot among the hijackers. The FBI then named Abdulaziz al-Omari as a hijacker.
 
A man with the same name as those given by the FBI turned up alive in Saudi Arabia, saying that he had studied at the University of Denver and his passport was stolen there in 1995. The name, origin, birth date, and occupation were released by the FBI, but the picture was not of him. "I couldn't believe it when the FBI put me on their list", he said. "They gave my name and my date of birth, but I am not a suicide bomber. I am here. I am alive. I have no idea how to fly a plane. I had nothing to do with this."

See also
 PENTTBOM
 Hijackers in the September 11 attacks

References

External links
 The Final 9/11 Commission Report
 portal.telegraph.co.uk (Article which reports that the Saudi Arabian Airlines pilot named Omari was not involved with the terrorist attacks)

American Airlines Flight 11
2001 deaths
Participants in the September 11 attacks
Saudi Arabian al-Qaeda members
1979 births
Saudi Arabian mass murderers
People from Al-Bahah Province